The Anděl Awards is a Czech music award ceremony organized by the Czech Academy of Popular Music. It is a successor to the Annual Czechoslovak Music Award (Czech: Výroční československé hudební ceny) established in 1991 in Czechoslovakia. Between 1992 and 1995, it was known as Gramy, with award categories matching the American Grammy Awards and the prize being represented by a ceramic gramophone statuette. Since 1997, it bears the current name, with the prize including a statuette of an angel with open wings playing a horn, designed by sculptor Jaroslav Róna.

Name history
 1991: Annual Czechoslovak Music Award (Czech: Výroční československé hudební ceny)
 1992–1995: Gramy
 1996: Czech Grammys (Czech: Česká Gramy)
 1997: Academy of Music Awards (Czech: Ceny Hudební akademie)
 1998–2000: Academy of Popular Music Awards (Czech: Ceny Akademie populární hudby)
 2001–2002: Anděl
 2003–2007: Anděl Allianz
 2008–present: Anděl

Categories

Award categories
 Band of the Year
 Male Singer of the Year
 Female Singer of the Year
 Hall of Fame
 Discovery of the Year
 Composition of the Year
 Album of the Year
 Video of the Year
 Slovak Album of the Year

Genre awards as of 2020
 Alternative & Electronic
 Folk
 Jazz
 Classical
 Rap
 Rock

Most successful artists

Winners by year

References

External links

 

Czech music
Czech music awards
Awards established in 1997
Czech television shows